The 1948–49 Oklahoma A&M Aggies men's basketball team represented Oklahoma A&M College, now known as Oklahoma State University, in NCAA competition in the 1948–49 season.

NCAA tournament
West
 Oklahoma A&M 40, Wyoming 39
Final Four
 Oklahoma A&M 55, Oregon State 35
Finals
 Kentucky 46, Oklahoma A&M 36

Rankings

Awards and honors

Team players drafted into the NBA

References

Oklahoma State Cowboys basketball seasons
Oklahoma AandM
NCAA Division I men's basketball tournament Final Four seasons
Oklahoma AandM
Oklahoma State
Oklahoma State